Zaidpur is a town and a nagar panchayat in Barabanki district, Uttar Pradesh, India.

Geography 
Zaidpur village covers approximately 3 km2 of non-mountainous terrain.

Location 
Its nearest service centre is Nawabganj, approximately 20 km to the northwest and its nearest city is Lucknow, approximately 30 km to the west. Faizabad is further away to the east. Delhi and Agra lie to the west. The border with Nepal lies approximately 150 km to the northeast. Zaidpur's elevation is 109 metres (357 feet).

Transport 
Zaidpur lies on state highway 13. The nearest passenger airport is the Chaudhary Charan Singh International Airport at Lucknow,  from Zaidpur.

Hydrology 
Derivatives of the Ganga river and Gomti River, local rain in wet months and wells supply water to Zaidpur.

Climate 
July is the wettest month in Zaidpur with an average 22 rain days and average monthly precipitation of 237mm. The wet season is between May and September. The hottest month is May with an average high temperature of 40 °C. The coldest month is January with an average low temperature of 8 °C.

Demographics 
The Zaidpur Nagar Panchayat has population of 34,443 of which 17,747 are males while 16,696 are females as per report released by 2011 Census of India. Population of Children with age of 0-6 is 5614 which is 16.30% of total population of Zaidpur (NP). In Zaidpur Nagar Panchayat, Female Sex Ratio is of 941 against state average of 912. Moreover, Child Sex Ratio in Zaidpur is around 982 compared to Uttar Pradesh state average of 902. Literacy rate of Zaidpur city is 49.50% lower than state average of 67.68%. In Zaidpur, male literacy is around 55.67% while female literacy rate is 42.89%. Muslims form 81.89% of the total population. Remaining population in overwhelmingly Hindu.

Economy 
Due to unemployment, people of this town are compelled to work in Metropolitan cities. A substantial number of people work in the government sector.
Enterprises in Zaidpur include a postal service; bank; school; an LPG gas agency; sugar cane farming equipment sales; winnowing fan sales; cinema halls; medical services; and small scale textile manufacturing and hub for export quality handloom products and produced a lot of exporters ,   scarves and cotton stoles from a tradition of hand-loom weaving).

References 

Cities and towns in Barabanki district
Illustrated historical album of The Rajas and Taluqdars of Oudh 1980
By Darogah Haji Abbas Ali 
Printed by North western provincesand Oudh government press Allahabad .
File:An illustrated historical album of the Rajas and Taaluqdars of Oudh by Darogah Haji Abbas Ali 1880.djvu